Xenodochus as a genus name may refer to:

 Meroctenus, a genus of beetles formerly called Xenodochus.
 Xenodochus (fungus)